The Front national des musiciens was an organization of musicians in Nazi occupied France that was part of the French Resistance. Active from the Spring of 1941 through the Autumn of 1944, the group's most prominent members were composers Elsa Barraine and Louis Durey, and conductor Roger Désormière. The organization had links to the French Communist Party resistance group.

References

French Resistance networks and movements